Asif Kamran Dar (born April 16, 1966) is a former boxer from Pakistan, competing in the lightweight (– 60 kg) division. He was born in Quetta.

A resident of Toronto, Ontario he represented Pakistan at the 1984 Summer Olympics in Los Angeles, where he was eliminated in the second round. Afterwards he competed for Canada, representing that country at the 1988 Summer Olympics in Seoul, South Korea where he was also eliminated in the second round. He won the gold medal in the same weight division, two years earlier, at the 1986 Commonwealth Games, beating Welshman Neil Haddock in the final. He also represented Canada at the 1987 Pan American Games.

References

External links
 
 

1966 births
Living people
Canadian people of Kashmiri descent
Lightweight boxers
Boxers at the 1984 Summer Olympics
Boxers at the 1986 Commonwealth Games
Boxers at the 1987 Pan American Games
Boxers at the 1988 Summer Olympics
Boxers from Toronto
Commonwealth Games gold medallists for Canada
Pan American Games competitors for Canada
Olympic boxers of Canada
Olympic boxers of Pakistan
Pakistani male boxers
Pakistani emigrants to Canada
Naturalized citizens of Canada
Pakistani people of Kashmiri descent
People from Quetta
Canadian male boxers
Canadian sportspeople of Pakistani descent
Commonwealth Games medallists in boxing
Medallists at the 1986 Commonwealth Games